Nottingham University Press (NUP) was the academic press of the University of Nottingham, England.  Founded in 1992 by Dr Des Cole and Dr Phil Garnsworthy, the press specialised in scientific and technical publishing, particularly in the areas of animal and food science (in line with the university's strengths).

In 2012, NUP was purchased by 5m Publishing.

References

Companies based in Nottingham
Publishing companies established in 1992
University of Nottingham
University presses of the United Kingdom